WYVL is a radio station airing a Christian Contemporary Music format, licensed to Youngsville, Pennsylvania, broadcasting on 88.5 MHz FM. The station is owned by Calvary Chapel of Russell, Pennsylvania.

WYVL also airs blocks of Christian Talk and Teaching programming early mornings and late evenings including; Truth for Life with Alistair Begg, Word for Today with Chuck Smith, and A New Beginning with Greg Laurie.

History
In its first several years of operation, WYVL operated a Christian-oriented classic rock format. The station adopted a more conventional contemporary Christian music format February 1, 2016.

Simulcasts
WYVL's programming is simulcast on WTWT 90.5 in Bradford, Pennsylvania and WZDV 92.1 in Amherst, New York, as well as a translator at 98.7 MHz in Jamestown, New York. WZDV is officially operated as a joint venture between Calvary Chapel of Russell and Calvary Chapel of the Niagara Frontier.

An additional full-service signal, WGIP 89.1 in Tidioute, Pennsylvania, was sold to rival religious broadcaster Family Life Network in May 2020 in exchange for forgiveness of a debt and was eventually relocated to Union City, Pennsylvania as WCGT.

References

External links
WYVL's official website

YVL
Radio stations established in 1999
1999 establishments in Pennsylvania
Jamestown, New York
Calvary Chapel Association